Tasgaon-Kavathe Mahankal Assembly constituency is one of the 288 Vidhan Sabha (legislative assembly) constituencies of Maharashtra state in western India.

Overview
Tasgaon-Kavathe Mahankal constituency is one of the eight Vidhan Sabha constituencies located in the Sangli district. It comprises part of Tasgaon tehsil and the entire Kavathe Mahankal tehsil of the district.

Tasgaon-Kavathe Mahankal is part of the Sangli Lok Sabha constituency along with five other Vidhan Sabha segments in this district, namely Miraj, Sangli, Palus-Kadegaon, Khanapur and Jat.

This constituency comes under a drought prone area where every year farmers are facing water shortages. The famous grape growing area comes under this zone. There is overwhelming demand for canal water from the Mhaishal canal water project but still farmers are waiting for the release of water.

Members of Legislative Assembly

Key

Election Results

Assembly elections 1999

Assembly elections 2004

Assembly elections 2009

Assembly elections 2014

2015 By-election

Assembly elections 2019

See also
 Tasgaon
 Kavathe-Mahankal
 List of constituencies of Maharashtra Vidhan Sabha

References

Assembly constituencies of Maharashtra
Sangli district